Pat Du Pré and Brian Teacher were the defending champions but they competed with different partners that year, Du Pré with Lloyd Bourne and Teacher with Bruce Manson.

Bourne and Du Pré lost in the first round to Tony Graham and Matt Mitchell.

Manson and Teacher lost in the quarterfinals to Andy Andrews and John Sadri.

John McEnroe and Peter Rennert won the doubles title at the 1982 Queen's Club Championships tennis tournament defeating Victor Amaya and Hank Pfister in the final 7–6, 7–5.

Seeds

Draw

Final

Top half

Bottom half

References

External links
Official website Queen's Club Championships 
ATP tournament profile

Doubles